Hwang Jung-min (born September 1, 1970) is a South Korean actor. He is one of the highest-grossing actors in South Korea, and has starred in several box office hits such as Ode to My Father (2014), Veteran (2015), The Himalayas (2015), A Violent Prosecutor (2015) and The Wailing (2016). Hwang is the third actor in South Korea to be part of the "100 Million Viewer Club" in Chungmuro.

Career

1995–2004: Beginnings and Transition to films
Hwang Jung-min began his career in musical theatre, making his acting debut in Line 1 in 1995. He then starred in various musicals and plays in Daehangno such as Jesus Christ Superstar and Cats.

Despite a career on stage, Hwang had difficulty transitioning to film. He went through a long struggle for recognition, with people saying he "didn't have the right face for film." He even considered giving up his dream, but stuck to his conviction about walking the path of acting. Hwang said, "After becoming interested about the stage and how it feels to be that person on stage, I've never thought of anything else. That I never swayed -- that is one thing I can say with confidence."

His big break came when he was cast in Waikiki Brothers, a 2001 film that was a sleeper hit in Korea. In his role as a hopeless drummer, Hwang left a strong impression and earned favorable reviews, with director Yim Soon-rye calling him "an uncut gemstone". Hwang went on to have prominent roles in Road Movie, A Good Lawyer's Wife, Heaven's Soldiers and A Bittersweet Life.

2005–2007: Mainstream breakthrough
But it was in 2005 that Hwang became a household name, portraying a naive farmer in love with an AIDS-stricken prostitute in the hit melodrama You Are My Sunshine. Hwang explains that he was "moved by the tale of the genuine love between two people. I agreed with the director's idea of showing it as pure love, like an uncut gem, without sloppily adding to it or embellishing it."

When he accepted the best actor award at the Blue Dragon Film Awards for his performance in You Are My Sunshine, many were moved by his now-famous speech: "All I did was add a spoon to a dinner table that had already been prepared by others."

He received further acclaim for his roles as an insurance investigator in Black House, a troubled club CEO who falls in love with a woman with a terminal illness in  Happiness, a superhero in A Man Who Was Superman and a private detective in Private Eye.

Hwang has said that when choosing scripts, he looks at the overall storyline rather than the character itself. He then exerts effort to continuously bring out the character's inner workings. Hwang said, "It is very important that you don't get too absorbed in yourself. You must always remember that there is another person watching the scene. Maintaining objectivity is important." Hwang emphasizes sincerity and empathy in his acting. "The camera doesn't lie. You can never fool the viewer. You have to act with your heart, not your head." It is because of this commitment to emotional truth that Hwang can confidently tell interviewers that he is 100 percent satisfied with his work. During a crisis on set, or when he is either feeling too satisfied or caught up in mannerisms, he takes out notes he made when he first read the screenplay. He said, "I look at the screenplay again and again. That's where all the answers are."

2008–2012: Return to theater, Television series and Directorial debut
He made a triumphant return to the stage in the 2008 production of Nine. The theater producer said that it took three years to cast the leading role because in Hwang he had found the right actor to rival Antonio Banderas' Broadway performance. He has since starred in University of Laughs, The Wedding Singer and Man of La Mancha. Hwang says, "A movie is the art of a director but the play is the art of an actor."

2009's The Accidental Couple was particularly special to Hwang, as it was his first time starring in a television drama in his 14-year acting career.

For his role as a blind swordsman in the 2010 period film Blades of Blood, Hwang went to schools for the blind to observe their movements. He then starred in The Unjust, a highly acclaimed noir about corruption in the South Korean justice system; followed by conspiracy film Moby Dick as a reporter.

Hwang then reunited with  actress Uhm Jung-hwa (whom he previously starred with in 2005 ensemble romantic comedy All for Love) in the 2012 box office hit Dancing Queen. He returned to TV in the 2012 cable drama Korean Peninsula, but it was less successful.

In late 2012, Hwang made his debut as a theatre director in Stephen Sondheim's musical Assassins, which he also starred in.

2013–present: Acclaim
Hwang returned his focus to films, starring in noir film New World (2013), where his performance was singled out by The New York Times. He once again worked with Uhm Jung-hwa in the queer film In My End Is My Beginning (which was expanded from a short film in 2009's Five Senses of Eros). Hwang then played a middle-aged fighter in the sports film Fists of Legend, performing all the stunts himself.

In 2014, Hwang starred in romance drama Man in Love. He said that he chose to star in the film to support diversity in the Korean film industry, and because he wanted to show the human side of his character, a terminally ill gangster who falls in love for the first time.

Then later in the year, Hwang headlined Ode to My Father, embodying the Korean everyman against the backdrop of modern history from the 1950s to the present day; the film depicted the Hungnam evacuation during the Korean War, coalmining gastarbeiters in Germany in the 1960s, and the Vietnam War. Ode to My Father became the second highest-grossing film in the history of Korean cinema, with 14.2 million tickets sold.

He reunited with The Unjust director Ryoo Seung-wan in 2015 for Veteran, playing a hot-tempered police detective tracking an arrogant and heartless chaebol heir. The film was another smash hit, and is currently the 3rd all-time highest-grossing film in Korean cinema history. Hwang then starred in the budget mountaineering film The Himalayas, where he plays renowned Korean mountaineer Um Hong-gil, who became the first person to reach the 16 highest mountain peaks on Earth.

In 2016, he starred alongside Kang Dong-won in the crime comedy A Violent Prosecutor, which became the second highest-grossing film of 2016. This was followed by Na Hong-jin's critically acclaimed horror The Wailing, and noir film Asura: The City of Madness, which premiered at the 41st Toronto Film Festival. Hwang was named Gallup Korea's Films Actor of the Year for 2016.

Hwang then starred in the war film The Battleship Island alongside So Ji-sub and Song Joong-ki. The film marks his second collaboration with director Ryoo Seung-wan following Veteran.

In 2018, he starred in The Spy Gone North, a spy film directed by Yoon Jong-bin. He was also cast in the science fiction film Return.

Personal life 
Hwang married musical theatre actress Kim Mi-hye on September 6, 2004. They have a son named Hwang Sae-hyun.

His younger brother is music director/composer Hwang Sang-jun.

On average, Hwang stars in three to four films a year. To critics who say that he does too many, Hwang responded, "I believe it is the responsibility of actors to try their best at acting when they come across screenplays that suit them. I breathe only when I act."

Filmography

Film

Television series

Web series

Music video appearances

Theater 
 Richard the Third (2021–2022)
 Okepi (Orchestra Pit) (2015-2016)
 Assassins (2012-2013)
 Man of La Mancha (2012)
 The Wedding Singer (2009-2010)
 University of Laughs (2008-2009)
 Nine (2008)
 42nd Street (2004)
 Tommy (2001)
 Cats (1999)
 Moskito (1999)
 Jesus Christ Superstar (1997)
 Gaeddongi (1997-1998)
 Blood Brothers (1997)
 Line 1 (1995-1996, 2000, 2006)

Discography 
 "We" by Jang Dong-gun, Kim Seung-woo, Hwang Jung-min, Gong Hyung-jin, Ji Jin-hee, Lee Ha-na - Actors Choice single, 2010
 "누구를 위한 삶인가" Who are you living for? by Leessang feat. Hwang Jung-min and Ryoo Seung-bum - from Bloody Tie OST, 2006
 "너는 내 운명 Sun Together" You are my destiny (Sun Together) by Hwang Jung-min and Jeon Do-yeon - from You Are My Sunshine OST, 2005
 "You're My Sunshine" by Hwang Jung-min - from You Are My Sunshine OST, 2005
 "A Honeyed Question" by Hwang Jung-min - from A Bittersweet Life OST, 2005

Awards and nominations

Listicles

References

External links 

 Hwang Jung-min  at SEM Company
 
 
 

South Korean male film actors
South Korean male musical theatre actors
South Korean male stage actors
South Korean male television actors
Seoul Institute of the Arts alumni
1970 births
Living people
20th-century South Korean male actors
21st-century South Korean male actors